William McKie may refer to:

William McKie (musician) (1901–1984), Australian-British organist, conductor and composer
William McKie (wrestler) (1886–1956), British wrestler and Olympic athlete

See also
William Mackay (disambiguation)
William McKay (disambiguation)
William McKee (disambiguation)